The men's 800 metres T53 event at the 2020 Summer Paralympics in Tokyo, took place on 2 September 2021.

Records
Prior to the competition, the existing records were as follows:

Results

Heats
Heat 1 took place on 2 September 2021, at 11:21:

Heat 2 took place on 2 September 2021, at 11:29:

Final
The final took place on 2 September, at 20:03:

References

Men's 800 metres T53
2021 in men's athletics